The sixth series of the British Sitcom series 'Allo 'Allo! contains eight episodes which first aired between 2 September and 21 October 1989 and repeated between 11 May and 29 June 1992.

Series 6 and subsequent episodes were 30 minutes in length, as they were not co-commissioned for the American market (as series 5 was). Jack Haig was originally meant to star in the series; but his death before the start of production prevented this. As the LeClerc character was important to the series, Derek Royle was brought in to play the part of Ernest LeClerc, Roger's brother. Naturally, the two characters are very similar in the roles that they play within the show's plot. The show also features the last appearance of Gavin Richards as Bertorelli who would be recast by Roger Kitter and Ernest would later be recast by Robin Parkinson.

The following episode names are the ones found on the British R2 DVDs with alternate region titles given below them.

Cast

Episodes

References

External links 

1989 British television seasons
 6
'Allo 'Allo! seasons